Jim Williamson (5 February 1909 – 24 February 2003) was an Australian rules footballer who played with Carlton in the Victorian Football League (VFL).

He later served as the Moderator of the Presbyterian Church of South Australia.

Notes

External links 

Jim Williamson's profile at Blueseum

1909 births
2003 deaths
Carlton Football Club players
Australian rules footballers from Victoria (Australia)
Ararat Football Club players